Kahur Lut (also Romanized as Kahūr Lūt) is a village in Geshmiran Rural District, in the Central District of Manujan County, Kerman Province, Iran. At the 2006 census, its population was 28, in 9 families.

References 

Populated places in Manujan County